The NBA Play-In Tournament is the preliminary National Basketball Association (NBA) postseason tournament. It determines the final two playoff seeds in the Eastern Conference and Western Conference and is played immediately prior to the NBA Playoffs, which is the main tournament of the postseason and regarded by the league as separate from the Play-In Tournament. Teams finishing the regular season in positions 7 through 10 in the standings for each conference compete to determine the number 7 and 8 seeds in each conference's bracket tournament.

Format

Original format
On June 4, 2020, the NBA Board of Governors approved the first ever play-in game for the 2019–20 season. The game was part of the NBA's plans for a bubble as part of its return to play during the COVID-19 pandemic. If the 8 and 9 seeds in either conference were within four games of each other, the two seeds would play each other in a play-in game. If the 8 seed won the game, it would advance to the playoffs. If the 9 seed won, a second game would be played. Only if the 9 seed won the second game would it advance to the playoffs.

Current format
On November 19, 2020, the NBA Board of Governors approved a format for the 2020–21 season to have a playoff Play-In Tournament involving the teams that ranked 7th through 10th in each conference. On July 22, 2022, the NBA Board of Governors made this format permanent.

The format is similar to the first two rounds of the Page–McIntyre system for a four-team playoff. The 9th place team hosts the 10th place team in an elimination game. The 7th hosts the 8th place team in the double-chance game, with the winner advancing as the 7-seed. The loser of this game then hosts the winner of the elimination game between the 9th and 10th place teams to determine the 8-seed. The NBA's regular playoff format then proceeds as normal.

The current bracket structure in each conference is as follows:

Results

2020

2020 was the only season to use the original play-in game structure. The teams finishing 8th and 9th in each conference competed for the final playoff seed in their conference, but only if they finished within four games of each other, in which case the lower-ranked team could advance to their conference playoffs only by defeating the higher-ranked team twice.

Western Conference
Because ninth-place Memphis (34–39) finished the season one-half game behind eighth-place Portland (35–39), a play-in was required to determine the 8th seed in the conference.

Eastern Conference
Because ninth-place Washington (25–47) finished  games behind eighth-place Orlando (33–40), no play-in was contested.

2021

2021 was the first season to use the Page–McIntyre system. Teams finishing in positions 7 through 10 in each conference qualified for play-in games to determine the final two playoff seeds for each conference.

Western Conference

Eastern Conference

2022

2022 was the second season to use the Page–McIntyre system. Teams finishing in positions 7 through 10 in each conference qualified for play-in games to determine the final two playoff seeds for each conference.

Western Conference

Eastern Conference

Results by position
The below table shows teams' results per their conference position entering the play-in tournament, since the NBA adopted the current format in 2021.

Updated through the 2022 play-in tournament.

Television coverage
In 2020, ABC aired the only play-in game. Since 2021, TNT and ESPN have held the television rights to the tournament. In 2021, these rights  were determined by the conference finals the network was airing. In 2022 this was changed, TNT aired the 7–8 games and ESPN aired the 9–10 games. However, the television rights for the final seed game will still be determined by which conference final ESPN/TNT is airing.

References

External links
 NBA official website

Recurring sporting events established in 2020
play-in tournament